Mark Trueblood is an American engineer and astronomer. He pioneered the development of robotic telescopes, as the author of several articles and two books, including Microcomputer Control of Telescopes and Telescope Control, co-authored with Russell M. Genet. Trueblood worked on the Gemini Observatory. He is the owner and operator of Winer Observatory in Sonoita, Arizona, which is the site of several professional research projects. The asteroid 15522 Trueblood is named in his honor.

Biography 
Trueblood was born in 1948 in Cincinnati, Ohio, and spent most of his childhood there, where his parents encouraged his interest in astronomy. At the age of 12, he read Jean Texereau's book "How to Make a Telescope" and ordered a mirror-grinding kit from what was then the Edmund Scientific Company. He completed a 6-inch f/8 mirror and the telescope when he was 14, the same year his father's company transferred the family to Geneva, Switzerland for two years. Mark attended the International School of Geneva during the years 1962-1964, returning to Cincinnati the summer of 1964. He graduated from Finneytown High School in June, 1966 as the Salutatorian of his class. He went on to Brown University that autumn, where he graduated in May 1971 with the degrees AB-ScB (Honors) in Physics. He attended the Ph. D program at Wesleyan University for one year, then moved to the Washington, D.C., area in the autumn of 1972. There he worked for the Smithsonian Institution for two years, then a succession of "Beltway Bandit" software government contractors, primarily on contracts with NASA's Goddard Space Flight Center. During his 18 years in the Washington, D.C., area, he spent his final nine years with the Ford Aerospace Corporation, rising to the position of Program Manager. Among his assignments at Ford, he headed the development of the Hubble Space Telescope control center at GSFC. While in the DC area, Trueblood attended the University of Maryland and earned his master's degree in Astronomy in 1983. Michael F. A'Hearn, the Deep Impact Principal Investigator, supervised his thesis on "Small Telescope Automation."

In 1990, Trueblood moved to Tucson, Arizona, to assume a position with the National Optical Astronomy Observatory (NOAO, which serves as the US national observatory) at the National Solar Observatory. There he worked for almost four years on the Global Oscillation Network Group (GONG) program as a software engineer. He began work in December 1994 in what is now the NOAO Gemini Science Center, assisting the NGSC Director in overseeing the development of instruments in the US for the Gemini 8-meter telescopes. In 2012, Trueblood left NOAO to join the OSIRIS-ReX project at the University of Arizona. He retired in 2013, but still tracks Near Earth Objects (asteroids and comets with the potential of striking Earth) using regional 2-meter class telescopes.

References

External links 
Biography at the Winer Observatory

1948 births
Living people
Wesleyan University alumni
American astronomers
21st-century American engineers
International School of Geneva alumni